Crosson Ice Shelf is an Antarctic ice shelf, about  wide, north and northeast of Mount Murphy along the Walgreen Coast of Marie Byrd Land. The ice shelf is nurtured by Smith, Pope, Vane, and Haynes Glaciers. It was mapped by the U.S. Geological Survey from surveys and from U.S. Navy air photos, 1959–66, and named by the Advisory Committee on Antarctic Names for Commander W.E. Crosson, U.S. Navy, Commanding Officer of the Antarctic Construction Group during Operation Deep Freeze 1973.

See also
 Ice shelves of Antarctica

References

Ice shelves of Antarctica
Bodies of ice of Marie Byrd Land